Pyrgotis consentiens is a species of moth of the family Tortricidae. It is endemic to New Zealand. The holotype specimen of P. consentiens is held at the New Zealand Arthropod Collection (NZAC).  Specimens of this species have also been collected on Stewart Island as well as in the Hunter Mountains.

The wingspan is 12–15 mm. The forewings are purplish red. The hindwings are fuscous.

References

Moths described in 1916
Archipini
Moths of New Zealand
Endemic fauna of New Zealand
Taxa named by Alfred Philpott
Endemic moths of New Zealand